The Anglican Church of St John the Baptist in Burford, Oxfordshire, England is a Grade I listed building.

The Church of England parish church is dedicated to Saint John the Baptist, and is described by David Verey as "a complicated building which has developed in a curious way from the Norman". It is known for its merchants' guild chapel and memorial to Henry VIII's barber-surgeon, Edmund Harman, which features South American Indians.

History

The current building was started in the 12th century. The current configuration of the building was completed by the 15th century as a Wool church.

In 1649, during the English Civil War, a group of Levellers, part of the New Model Army Banbury mutineers, were imprisoned in the church.

It underwent extensive Victorian restoration by George Edmund Street in 1870s and was one of the cases which led to William Morris's founding of the Society for the Protection of Ancient Buildings. The restoration included the addition of a tiled floor.

The parish and benefice of Burford is within the Diocese of Oxford.

Architecture

The stone building has a cruciform plan. It consists of a five-bay nave with chapels to the north and south sides. The tower and spire are above the centre of the building.

The interior includes a pulpit which was restored in 1870 and a variety of tomb chests and memorials. Much of the stained glass is by Charles Eamer Kempe.

There are a lot of memorials, the best known of which are to Christoper Kempster (died 1715, a local quarry-man and favourite of Sir Christopher Wren, who used him at St Paul's Cathedral), and the c.1569 Harman memorial, on north wall, which has Gill-like South American Indians in relief. In the Gild Chapel the south wall is lined with roughly similar pedimented tomb-chests mostly to the Sylvester family; there is a similar chest in south choir aisle.

References

External links

 Church web site

Burford
Burford
Burford